Finding Kukan is a 2016 feature-length documentary investigating the story of Chinese Hawaii-born producer Li Ling-Ai, the female co-producer of the film Kukan (1941).

Release 
After its world premiere at the Hawaii International Film Festival on May 5, 2016, Finding Kukan was screened at DOC NYC, CAAAMFest, the Seattle International Film Festival and at film festivals, conferences, churches and special events in Chicago, Los Angeles, San Diego, Atlanta, Vancouver, Winnipeg, Boston, Philadelphia, Washington, DC, Baltimore, Fresno, Mendocino, Oakland and Bend, among others.

The film was broadcast on PBS television as part of the America ReFramed documentary series on September 7, 2018 documentary series.

Accolades

References

External links
Official Website

2016 films
Films about Chinese Americans
American independent films
2010s English-language films
2010s American films